The Battle of Crête-à-Pierrot was a major battle of the Haitian Revolution that took place from 4 March until 24 March 1802.

The battle took place at the Crête-à-Pierrot fort (in Haitian Creole Lakrèt-a-Pyewo), east of Saint-Marc on the valley of the Artibonite River. The French colonial army, consisting of 2,000 men led by General Charles Leclerc, blockaded the fort, which was defended by Jean-Jacques Dessalines's Haitian rebels. The fort was strategically important as it controlled access to the Cahos Mountains. With their food and munitions supplies depleted, Dessalines's rebels forced the French blockade and escaped to the mountains. Here, Dessalines's forces massacred many French civilians, and then regained control of the Crête-à-Pierrot fort on 11 March.

On 12 March, the French forces attempted to gain control of the fort, but failed; Jean Boudet's French forces suffered losses of 480, and Dessalines's forces suffered losses of 200-300. Another attempt on 22 March led to 300 French deaths. On 24 March, Dessalines's forces abandoned the fort in the night due to their heavy losses and the French gained control. The French had suffered major losses, including the death of General Charles Dugua. Alexandre Pétion, a mixed-race Haitian general, had played an important role when he deployed his cannon on a hill overlooking the fort.

Following the battle, Dessalines temporarily swore allegiance to France and joined his forces with Leclerc's, leading Toussaint Louverture, the Haitian leader, to agree to surrender. Though a defeat for the Haitians, the battle demonstrated their fighting qualities and showed that they could cause significant casualties to regular European forces. When disease disabled much of the French army, Dessalines once again returned to the field, now as the leader of the Haitian forces after the arrest and death of Louverture, and the story of the stubborn resistance of the Haitians at La Crête à Pierrot helped give his troops confidence.

References

External links
 The Battle of Crête-à-Pierrot. The Louverture Project.

Conflicts in 1802
Battles involving France
Haitian Revolution
1802 in France
1802 in the Caribbean
March 1802 events